Dorchester Missionary College, also known as the Dorchester College of St Peter and St Paul for Foreign Missions was a theological college in Dorchester, Oxfordshire. The college was established in 1878 to train Anglican clergy to serve in the Church of England overseas, and by 1903 was an associated theological college of Durham University. It closed in 1944 due to the recommendation by the Archbishops' commission to end missionary colleges.

References

Anglican seminaries and theological colleges
Former theological colleges in England
Education in Oxfordshire
Alumni of Dorchester Missionary College
Educational institutions established in 1878
1878 establishments in England